Damien Jurado is an American singer-songwriter from Seattle, Washington, United States. Over the years, he has released albums on Sub Pop, Secretly Canadian, Loose, and is currently on his own label Maraqopa Records.

Music career
Jurado's solo career began during the mid-1990s, releasing lo-fi folk based recordings on his own cassette-only label, Casa Recordings. Gaining a local cult following in Seattle, he was brought to the attention of Sub Pop Records by Sunny Day Real Estate singer Jeremy Enigk. After two 7-inch releases (Motorbike and Trampoline) Sub Pop issued his first full album, Waters Ave S. in 1997. His second album Rehearsals for Departure, was released in 1999, produced by Ken Stringfellow (The Posies, Big Star, R.E.M.).

He often makes use of found sound and field recording techniques, and has experimented with different forms of tape recordings. In 2000 he released Postcards and Audio Letters, a collection of found audio letters and fragments that he had found from sources such as thrift store tape players and answering machines. Also released in 2000 was Ghost of David, Jurado's bleakest and most personal sounding record to date. I Break Chairs (2002) was produced by long-time friend, Pedro the Lion's David Bazan. It was his last album for Sub Pop, and was a much rockier, electric affair.

After signing for the Indiana-based label Secretly Canadian, Jurado reverted to his trademark folk ballad-based style, releasing four more albums: Where Shall You Take Me? (2003), On My Way to Absence, (2005) And Now That I'm in Your Shadow (2006) and the rockier Caught in the Trees (2008).

In 2009, Jurado teamed with his brother Drake to issue an LP under the moniker Hoquiam, released on February 23, 2010. The album preceded Damien's next solo release, dubbed Saint Bartlett, which was released May 25, 2010 and was produced by label mate Richard Swift. After touring the album with Kay Kay and His Weathered Underground, Jurado began work on his next album. On February 21, 2012 he released his 10th studio album, Maraqopa, his sixth for Secretly Canadian. In January 2014, Jurado released Brothers and Sisters of the Eternal Son an album which marked the third straight collaboration with producer Richard Swift. In March 2016, Jurado released Visions of Us on the Land, and in December of the same year he and Swift released a collection of covers from 2010, Other People's Songs, Volume 1. In 2016, Damien Jurado released The Horizon Just Laughed, his first self produced album, teaming up with L.A. recording studio Sonikwire. In 2018, Jurado left Secretly Canadian to join Mama Bird Recording Co. and Loose Music and subsequently released the albums In The Shape Of A Storm (2019) and What's New, Tomboy? (2020)

On the 24th of June 2022 Jurado released his 18th full length studio album and the second on Maraqopa Records.

Collaborations and contributions 
Jurado appears on the tracks "Almost Home" and "The Dogs" on Moby's album Innocents.

He is also featured in an episode of the BYUtv music documentary series Audio-Files.

Jurado's song "Everything Trying" appeared in the NBC series The Blacklist (Season 1, episode 12), in the 2013 Best Foreign Film Oscar film The Great Beauty, in the Fox series House M.D. (Season 7, Episode 14), and in the 2011 film The Dilemma.

In the 2014 Joe Carnahan directed crime thriller Stretch, Jurado's song "Let Us All In" plays during the ending scene and into the credits.

He duets with Lotte Kestner on her song "Turn the Wolves" on the 2013 album The Bluebird of Happiness.

In the 2015 romantic comedy, Tumbledown, Jurado contributes to many songs on the soundtrack.

He has collaborated extensively with Richard Swift.

Jurado's track "A.M. AM" from his Visions of Us on the Land is prominently featured in Episode 3 as well as "Cloudy Shoes" from Saint Bartlett in Episode 6 of the 2018 Netflix documentary series Wild Wild Country.

Discography

Albums
Waters Ave S. (Sub Pop – January 1997)
Rehearsals for Departure (Sub Pop – March 1999)
Postcards and Audio Letters (2000, Made in Mexico)
Ghost of David (Sub Pop – September 2000)
I Break Chairs (Sub Pop – February 2002)
Where Shall You Take Me? (Secretly Canadian – March 2003)
This Fabulous Century (Burnt Toast – October 2004)
On My Way to Absence (Secretly Canadian – April 2005)
And Now That I'm in Your Shadow (Secretly Canadian – October 2006)
Caught in the Trees (Secretly Canadian – September 2008)
Saint Bartlett (Secretly Canadian – May 2010)
Live at Landlocked (Secretly Canadian – April 16, 2011)
Maraqopa (Secretly Canadian - February 21, 2012)
Brothers and Sisters of the Eternal Son (Secretly Canadian - January 21, 2014) UK #100, US #101
Visions of Us on the Land (Secretly Canadian - March 18, 2016)
Other People's Songs, Volume 1 (Secretly Canadian - December 2, 2016)
The Horizon Just Laughed (Secretly Canadian - May 4, 2018)
In the Shape of a Storm (Mama Bird Recording Co. / Loose - April 12, 2019)
What's New, Tomboy? (Mama Bird Recording Co. - May 1, 2020)
The Monster Who Hated Pennsylvania (Maraqopa Records - May 14, 2021)
Reggae Film Star (Maraqopa Records - June 24, 2022)

EPs
 Motorbike (1995, Sub Pop)
 Trampoline (1996, Sub Pop)
 Vary (1997, Tooth & Nail)
 Gathered in Song (1998, Made in Mexico)
 Four Songs (2001, Burnt Toast Vinyl)
 Holding His Breath (2003, Acuarela)
 Just in Time for Something (2004, Secretly Canadian)
 Traded for Fire/Ghost of David Split with Dolorean (2006, Secretly Canadian)
 Gathered in Song (2007, Made in Mexico; re-release with bonus tracks)
 LEM: Volume 1, January 2010 (2010, Flannelgraph Records/Crossroads of America)
 Our Turn to Shine EP (2010, Secretly Canadian; the Saint Bartlett bonus EP is exclusive to Amazon UK)
 Diamond Sea/Pentagrams (Part of The Maraqopa Sessions) (2012, Secretly Canadian)
 Clouds Beyond/Let As All In (Part of The Maraqopa Sessions) (2012, Secretly Canadian)
 Wyoming Songbirds/Ghost of David (The Return) (Part of The Maraqopa Sessions) (2012, Secretly Canadian)
 The Maraqopa Sessions EP (2012, Secretly Canadian; bonus EP to celebrate the inclusion of Maraqopa on Rough Trade's Best Album 2012 list)
 Recorded Live at Little Elephant (2017, Little Elephant)
 Unissued EP (2020) (2020, Self Release)

Singles
 "Halo Friendly" (1997, Summershine)
 "Chevrolet" (1998, UK only, Snowstorm)
 "Letters & Drawings" (1998, UK only, Ryko)
 "Big Let Down / Make Up Your Mind" (2002, Secretly Canadian)
 "Ohio" (2014, Filous Remix)
 "Exit 353" (2015)
 "Birds Tricked Into The Trees" (2020)
 "Alice Hyatt" (2020)
 "Helena" (2021)
 "Take Your Time" (2021)
 "Roger" (2022)

Tour-only releases
 Walk Along the Fence (2004)
 Untitled 6 song EP (2006)
 The Trees Tour EP (2007)
 European Tour CD-R (2009)
 Tour CD-R (2011)

Compilation appearances
 "Just a Closer Walk with Thee" – Bifrost Arts' Come O Spirit (Sounds Familyre, 2009)
 Badlands - Wages Of Sin w. Rosie Thomas
 Tooth & Nail Rock Sampler Volume 1 - Frustrated (1997)
 "Persuading You Near" (Working Man Records) - Fall Down
 ″'78 Ltd″ - Thirty 6
 ″Songs From The Big Top″ - Ashes
 ″The Unaccompanied Voice″ - An Accapella Compilation - Dance Hall Places
 ″It Goes Without Saying″ - aka Maremont - Kicking Steve Risley
 Like Others Need Oxygen - Mr Brown
 For the Kids Three - Small as Me
 SC100 - Upstate
 Unearthed - The Heron and The Fox
 Live at KEXP Vol 8 - Working Titles
 The Walking Dead Songs of Survival - I Will Still Be Dead
 It Happened Here - Kansas City

Guest appearances
 Lotte Kestner The Bluebird of Happiness - duet on Turn The Wolves.
 Rosie Thomas These Friends of Mine
 Lampshade Lets Away (vocals 2 tracks)
 Thomas Johnsson Denver First In Line EP - harmonica
 Kate Tucker and the Sons of Sweden - vocals on In The End
 Bosque Brown Plays Mara Lee Miller - backing vocals
 Husbands Love Your Wives - Tender Stories in Song Between Tender Friends / Live At The Triple Door - vocals and guitar.

Producer on other artists albums
 Naomi Wachira - S/T, 2013
 Shelby Earl - Swift Arrows, 2013
 Joel Walter - Nowhere In Fiction EP, 2011
 Joel Walter - Bitter Lake Reservoir, 2015
 Ben Fisher  - Does The Land Remember Me, 2018

References

External links
Official website
Loose: Damien Jurado
Secretly Canadian: Damien Jurado
Sub Pop: Damien Jurado

Living people
Sub Pop artists
Tooth & Nail Records artists
Singer-songwriters from Washington (state)
Year of birth missing (living people)
Musicians from Seattle
American indie rock musicians
American male singer-songwriters
Secretly Canadian artists
20th-century American singers
21st-century American singers
Loose Music artists
20th-century American male singers
21st-century American male singers